Mountmellick Athletic Club is a Laois-based athletics club, affiliated to both Laois Athletics and Athletics Ireland. Founded in 1876, the club is one of the oldest athletic clubs in Ireland.

History 
The club has been based in Mountmellick, a town in the north of County Laois, Ireland since the 1870s. They have trained and competed at Smiths Field Running Track since the 1950s  and have fielded top-class national level athletes in both cross country and middle distance running, particularly in the 1960s. , the club remained focused on a robust training programme for athletes in every age group and skill level. Mountmellick AC competes during the winter in cross country and road events, and during spring and summer in track and field. Their athletes, both male and female, range in age from under 10 to senior, and they compete in all scheduled events.

References 

1876 establishments in Ireland
Sports clubs established in 1876